Ugonna Ozurigbo  (born November 26, 1976) is a Nigerian politician. He was deputy speaker of the 8th Assembly of the Imo State House of Assembly beginning in July 2015.

Career 
On April 11, 2015, he was reelected by his people for another term in the Imo State House of Assembly. In the 7th Assembly, he was the house chief whip. He chaired, co-chaired and was a member of many committees. In the 8th Assembly he was elected deputy speaker.

On July 10, 2018, Ozuruigbo infamously moved for the impeachment of Deputy Governor Eze Madumere. The Owerri High Court nullified the impeachment which had been concocted by Governor Rochas Okorocha with members of Imo State House of Assembly. In the 2019 general elections, Ozurigbo was elected to the Federal House of Representative to represent Isu/Njaba/Nkwerre/Nwangele.
Rep. Ozurigbo is the House of Representatives Committee Chairman on Justice.

References 

1976 births
Living people
Imo State politicians
Abia State University alumni
Federal Polytechnic, Nekede alumni
People from Imo State